The 5th Toronto International Film Festival (TIFF) took place in Toronto, Ontario, Canada between September 4 and September 13, 1980. That year the festival hold a retrospective in honor of Jean-Luc Godard, who himself attended the retrospective which was organized by festival programmer Peter Harcourt. A large crowd gathered outside University theatre to catch a glimpse of Bette Midler at the premiere of her film Divine Madness.

Awards

Programme

Galas
Bad Timing by Nicolas Roeg
The Conductor (Dyrygent) by Andrzej Wajda
Death Watch by Bertrand Tavernier
Head On by Michael Grant
Loving Couples by Jack Smight
Loulou by Maurice Pialat
Mr. Patman by John Guillermin
Resurrection by Daniel Petrie
Suzanne by Robin Spry

Special Screenings
24 Hours
A Distant Cry from Spring by Yoji Yamada
Eye of the Master
Le Fils puni by Philippe Collin
My Sister the Negro by Dirk Jan Braat
Oblomov by Nikita Mikhalkov
Portrait of Teresa (Retrato de Teresa) by Pastor Vega
Royal Vacation (Vacances royales) by Gabriel Auer

Critic's Choice
Afternoon of War by Karl Francis
Anthracite by Édouard Niermans
The Buck's Party by Steve Jodrell
Dear Boys (Lieve jongens) by Paul de Lussanet
The Demise of Herman Durer (De Verwording van Herman Dürer) by Leon de Winter
Exterior Night (Extérieur, nuit) by Jacques Bral
Fernand by René Féret
House of the Lute by Shing-Hon Lau
In for Treatment by Erik van Zuylen and Marja Kok
Instant Pictures by George Schouten
Jaguar by Lino Brocka
 (Die letzten Jahre der Kindheit) by Norbert Kückelmann
Listen to the Lion by Henri Safran
Marilla and Mariena
Order (Ordnung) by Sohrab Shahid-Saless
Palm Beach by Albie Thoms
The Secret of Nikola Tesla (Tajna Nikole Tesle) by Krsto Papić
Simon Barbes (Simone Barbès ou la vertu) by Marie-Claude Treilhou
The Strange Case of Rachel K (El extraño caso de Rachel K) by Óscar Valdés
The Willi Busch Report (Der Willi-Busch-Report) by Niklaus Schilling

New Music
AC/DC: Let There Be Rock by Eric Dionysius and Eric Mistler
Blue Suede Shoes by Curtis Clark
Cha Cha by Herbert Curiel
D.O.A.: A Rite of Passage by Lech Kowalski
The Great Rock 'n' Roll Swindle by Julien Temple
Reggae Sunsplash by Stefan Paul
The Space Movie by Tony Palmer
Téléphone publique
Third World

Less Is More
Billy in the Lowlands by Jan Egleson
Clarence and Angel by Robert Gardner
Gal Young Un by Victor Nuñez
Good Riddance (Les Bons débarras) by Francis Mankiewicz
The Handyman (L'Homme à tout faire) by Micheline Lanctôt
Heartland by Richard Pearce
Parallels by Mark Schoenberg
Return of the Secaucus 7 by John Sayles
Union City by Marcus Reichert
The Whole Shootin' Match by Eagle Pennell

Jean-Luc Godard Retrospective

Buried Treasures
All I Desire by Douglas Sirk
Force of Evil by Abraham Polonsky
The Killing of a Chinese Bookie by John Cassavetes
Letter from an Unknown Woman by Max Ophüls
Midnight
Mouchette by Robert Bresson
The Mouth Agape (La Gueule ouverte) by Maurice Pialat

French Cinema
Le Coup de sirocco by Alexandre Arcady
Courage fuyons by Yves Robert
L'Enfant roi by René Féret
My Dearest (Ma chérie) by Marie-Christine Barrault
The Rascals (Les Turlupins) by Bernard Revon
The Red Sweater (Le pullover rouge) by Michel Drach

Israeli Film

Real to Reel
As If It Were Yesterday (Comme si c'était hier) by Myriam Abramowicz and Esther Hoffenberg
Divine Madness by Michael Ritchie
Garlic Is as Good as Ten Mothers by Les Blank
Lightning Over Water by Wim Wenders and Nicholas Ray
Memories of Duke by Gary Keys
Poto and Cabengo by Jean-Pierre Gorin
The Murder of Pedralbes (El asesino de Pedralbes) by Gonzalo Herralde
Prostitute by Tony Garnett
Temps morts by Claude Godard
The Trials of Alger Hiss by John Lowenthal

Kidstuff
Take Me Up to the Ball Game by Ken Stephenson
Tales from a Toyshop

References

External links
 Official site
 TIFF: A Reel History: 1976 - 2012
1980 Toronto International Film Festival at IMDb

1980
1980 film festivals
1980 in Toronto
1980 in Canadian cinema